Century Hall may refer to:

 Centennial Hall in Wrocław, Poland; alternate translation of name into English
 Red Men Hall (Reading, Pennsylvania), NRHP Listed building, completed in 1900
 Century Hall (Nagoya), part of the Nagoya Congress Center

Architectural disambiguation pages